Nupen is a small mountain in Troms og Finnmark county, Norway. The village of Bremnes, Kvæfjord lies just west of the mountain and the Andfjorden lies to the north. The mountain is known for its view of the midnight sun.

References

Kvæfjord
Harstad
Mountains of Troms og Finnmark